Edrich is a surname. Notable people with the surname include:

 Bill Edrich (1916–1986), English cricketer, Middlesex and England batsman
 Brian Edrich (1922–2009), English cricketer, Kent and Glamorgan batsman
 Eric Edrich (1914–1993), English cricketer, Lancashire wicket-keeper
 Geoff Edrich (1918–2004), English cricketer, Lancashire batsman
 John Edrich (1937–2020), English cricketer, Surrey and England batsman
 Justin Edrich (born 1961), English cricketer, Suffolk batsman